PharmaChoice Canada Inc is a member-owned cooperative of Canadian pharmacies headquartered in Dartmouth, Nova Scotia and Saskatoon, Saskatchewan.  It represents more than 1000 independent pharmacies across Canada, generating more than $2B in retail sales.

History 
PharmaChoice was founded in 1999 by Calvin LeRoux and partners.

External links

References

Companies based in Nova Scotia
Health care companies established in 1999
1999 establishments in Nova Scotia
Cooperatives in Canada
Canadian pharmacy brands